79th NBR Awards
January 15, 2008

Best Film: 
 No Country for Old Men 
The 79th National Board of Review Awards, honoring the best in film for 2007, were given on 15 January 2008.

Top 10 Films
No Country for Old Men (Best Film)
The Assassination of Jesse James by the Coward Robert Ford
Atonement
The Bourne Ultimatum
The Bucket List
Into the Wild
Juno
The Kite Runner
Lars and the Real Girl
Michael Clayton
Sweeney Todd: The Demon Barber of Fleet Street

Top Foreign Films
4 Months, 3 Weeks and 2 Days (4 luni, 3 saptamani si 2 zile)
The Band's Visit (Bikur Ha-Tizmoret)
The Counterfeiters (Die Fälscher)
La Vie En Rose (La môme)
Lust, Caution (Se, jie)

Top Five Documentaries
Darfur Now
In the Shadow of the Moon
Nanking
Taxi to the Dark Side
Toots

Top Independent Films
Away from Her
Great World of Sound
Honeydripper
In the Valley of Elah
A Mighty Heart
The Namesake
Once
The Savages
Starting Out in the Evening
Waitress

Winners
Best Actor:
George Clooney - Michael Clayton
Best Actress:
Julie Christie - Away from Her
Best Animated Film:
Ratatouille
Best Cast:
No Country for Old Men
Best Director:
Tim Burton - Sweeney Todd: The Demon Barber of Fleet Street
Best Directorial Debut:
Ben Affleck - Gone Baby Gone
Best Documentary Film:
Body of War
Best Film:
No Country for Old Men (Academy Award for Best Picture)
Best Foreign Language Film:
The Diving Bell and the Butterfly (Le scaphandre et le papillon) • France
Best Screenplay - Adapted:
No Country for Old Men - Joel and Ethan Coen
Best Screenplay - Original (tie):
Juno - Diablo Cody
Lars and the Real Girl - Nancy Oliver
Best Supporting Actor:
Casey Affleck - The Assassination of Jesse James by the Coward Robert Ford
Best Supporting Actress:
Amy Ryan - Gone Baby Gone
Breakthrough Male Performances:
Emile Hirsch - Into the Wild
Breakthrough Female Performances:
Elliot Page - Juno
Freedom of Expression Award (tie):
The Great Debaters
Persepolis
Career Achievement Award:
Michael Douglas
William K. Everson Award for Film History:
Robert Osborne
Career Award for Cinematography
Roger Deakins

Notes

References

External links

2007
2007 film awards
2007 in American cinema